Harold Keeling (10 February 1906 – 1988) was an English professional footballer who played in the Football League for Mansfield Town, Norwich City, Swindon Town and Torquay United.

References

1906 births
1988 deaths
English footballers
Association football forwards
English Football League players
Ashfield United F.C. players
Mansfield Town F.C. players
Nottingham Forest F.C. players
Grantham Town F.C.
Luton Town F.C. players
Wolverhampton Wanderers F.C. players
Notts County F.C. players
Torquay United F.C. players
Swindon Town F.C. players
Norwich City F.C. players
Bath City F.C. players
Hereford United F.C. players
Tamworth F.C. players
Brierley Hill Alliance F.C. players